Chumildén Airport ,  is a coastal airstrip  north of Chaitén, a town in the Los Lagos Region of Chile.

The airstrip is on the Gulf of Ancud next to the settlement of Chumildén. Approach and departure for either end run along the shoreline.

See also

Transport in Chile
List of airports in Chile

References

External links
OpenStreetMap - Chumildén
OurAirports - Chumildén
FallingRain - Chumildén Airport

Airports in Los Lagos Region